Sobrado may refer to:

 Sobrado (architecture), a Portuguese colonial house style

Places
Brazil:
 Sobrado, Paraíba, municipality in the state of Paraíba in the Northeast Region

Spain:
 Sobrado, Galicia, municipality in the province of A Coruña, Galicia
 Sobrado Abbey, more commonly known as Sobrado dos Monxes or Santa María de Sobrado, located in Sobrado, Galicia
 Sobrado, León, municipality in the province of León, Castile and León
 Sobrado (Tineo), a civil parish in Tineo, Asturias

Portugal:
 Sobrado (Castelo de Paiva)
 Sobrado (Valongo)
 Sobradelo da Goma